Admiral of the Red James Saumarez, 1st Baron de Saumarez (or Sausmarez), GCB (11 March 1757 – 9 October 1836) was an admiral of the British Royal Navy, known for his victory at the Second Battle of Algeciras.

Early life
Saumarez was born at St Peter Port, Guernsey to an old island family, the eldest son of Matthew de Sausmarez (1718-1778) and his second wife Carteret, daughter of James Le Marchant. He was a nephew of Captain Philip Saumarez and John de Sausmarez (1706-1774) of Sausmarez Manor. He was also the elder brother of General Sir Thomas Saumarez (1760-1845), Equerry and Groom of the Chamber to the Duke of Kent, and afterwards Commander-in-Chief of New Brunswick and of Richard Saumarez (1764-1835), a surgeon and medical author. Their sister married Henry Brock, the uncle of Major-General Sir Isaac Brock and Daniel de Lisle Brock. Many of de Sausmarez's ancestors had distinguished themselves in the naval service, and he entered it as midshipman at the age of thirteen. Upon joining the navy, he dropped the second 's' to become de Saumarez.

Naval service

Early service in the Mediterranean and American Revolutionary War

Placed on board , he was rated midshipman in November 1770.

In 1775, at the age of 18, Saumarez was ordered to Sir Peter Parker's flagship  in North America. Saumarez distinguished himself under Parker, showing courage and being promoted to acting lieutenant at the July 1776 Battle of Sullivan's Island which required the Bristol to fire broadsides at Fort Sullivan. The engagement lasted 13 hours and 111 men were killed in the Bristol.

He received his first command, the tender Lady Parker. On promotion to lieutenant in 1778 he received his second command, the 8-gun galley . After forty-seven engagements, unfortunately he had to run Spitfire ashore and burn her on 30 July 1778 when a French fleet under Admiral d'Estaing arrived at Narrangansett Bay. Saumarez then served on land at the Battle of Rhode Island before returning to Portsmouth.

Saumarez next served as third lieutenant in the Victory, under various admirals until it became Vice Admiral Hyde Parker's flagship, by which time he had moved up to 1st lieutenant. He was promoted commander and appointed to the fireship Tisiphone. In 1782, Saumarez sailed his ship to the West Indies with despatches for Samuel Hood and arrived in time to witness the closing stages of Hood's operations at St Kitts on 25 January 1782.

Battle of the Saintes
While commanding  (74 guns), Saumarez contributed to Rodney's victory over de Grasse at the Battle of the Saintes on (12 April 1782). During the battle and on his own initiative, Saumarez took his ship out of line to assist in the capture of De Grasse's flagship, Ville de Paris. This action prompted Admiral Rodney to remark that, "The Russell's captain is a fine fellow, whoever he is."

When the war in America was finished, Saumarez went ashore and did not go to sea again until 1793 when he was given command of the frigate , a 36-gun fifth rate frigate.

Action of 20 October 1793
 
It was in Crescent that Saumarez was involved in one of the first major single-ship actions of the war when he captured the French frigate Reunion, in the action of 20 October 1793. British casualties were exceptionally light, with only one man wounded during the engagement. In reward, Saumarez was knighted by King George III and given a presentation plate by the City of London, although he later received a bill for £103 6s 8d (the equivalent of £9,700 as of 2011), from a Mr. Cooke for "the honour of a knighthood". Saumarez refused to pay, telling Cooke to charge whoever had paid for Edward Pellew's knighthood after his successful action. Saumarez later wrote to his brother that "I think it hard to pay so much for an honour which my services have been thought to deserve".

Channel Islands Station (1794)

On 8 June 1794 on the way from Plymouth to Guernsey, the squadron, which included six smaller vessels, including hired armed lugger Cockchafer and Valiant, encountered a superior French force of two razees, three frigates, and a cutter. The French squadron outgunned the British by 192 guns to 92, but Saumarez succeeded in getting his frigates to safety by sailing between rocks on the west coast of Guernsey and around the island to the St Peter Port anchorage. The British luggers and cutters had returned to Plymouth before the start of the action. The British threat to any invasion force stayed intact.

Battle of Cape St Vincent

After being promoted in 1795, Saumarez was appointed to the 74-gun  in the Channel fleet, where he took part in the defeat of the French fleet at the Battle of Groix off Lorient on 22 June. Orion was one of the ships sent to reinforce Sir John Jervis in February 1797, when Saumarez distinguished himself in the Battle of Cape St. Vincent. During the early stages he helped repel a sustained attack on the British line and covered the retreat of  when she was forced to retire from the action. Colossus had sustained serious damage, her sails being virtually shot away and it looked as though she would be raked by Spanish warships, until Orion intervened. Saumarez was certain he had forced her surrender too when the arrival of the remainder of the Spanish fleet forced Jervis to break off the engagement.

Blockade of Cadiz and the Battle of the Nile

Saumarez remained with Jervis's fleet and was present at the blockade of Cadiz from February 1797 to April 1798. In May 1798, the Orion joined the squadron under Nelson's command that was sent into the Mediterranean to seek and destroy the French. Saumarez was Nelson's second in command at the Battle of the Nile where he distinguished himself once more, forcing the surrender of the Peuple Souverain and the 80-gun Franklin.

Battle of Algeciras and Gut of Gibraltar

In 1801 he was promoted to the rank of Rear-Admiral of the Blue, was created a baronet, and received the command of a small squadron which was to watch the movements of the Spanish fleet at Cadiz. Between 6 and 12 July he performed an excellent piece of service in the Algeciras campaign. In the first battle of Algeciras he launched an attack on a French squadron anchored under the protection of shore batteries in Algeciras Bay. Extensive shoals and a fickle breeze hindered his chances of success and HMS Hannibal was lost. Where he showed true merit was in refusing to accept this first defeat and in repairing his ships and regrouping for a further attack. When the French squadron, reinforced by Spanish ships sent from Cádiz made to leave the bay, Saumarez, although substantially outnumbered went in pursuit. He sent HMS Superb, Captain Richard Goodwin Keats, ahead and that ship almost singlehandedly brought about the destruction of two Spanish three-deckers and the capture of a French 74 in the Second Battle of Algeciras also known as Battle of the Gut of Gibraltar. For his services, Saumarez received the Order of the Bath and the Freedom of the City of London. In 1803, the United Kingdom Parliament bestowed upon him an annuity of £1200 a year (Annuity to Admiral Saumarez Act 1803).

During the Peace of Amiens, 1802-3 Saumarez remained at home with his family in Guernsey, and when war broke out again he was given command of the naval forces defending the Channel Islands. He therefore was not present at the 1805 Battle of Trafalgar. On 23 April 1804 he was promoted to Rear-Admiral of the White.

Channel Islands Station (1806-08)
On 9 November 1805 he was advanced to the rank of Rear-Admiral of the Red. In 1806 he took command of the Channel Islands squadron on that station for the second time, his flagship was HMS Inconstant. Whilst in command he was promoted Vice-Admiral in April 1807, his flagship was HMS Prince of Wales. He remained in command of the station until February 1808.

The Baltic Campaign
Saumarez's mission was to protect the British trade which was of vital importance for Royal Navy supplies and to blockade enemy ports such as those under French control in northern Germany. The Russian fleet was also kept under blockade until Alexander I reopened Russian ports. On 13 July 1810 he was promoted to the rank of Vice-Admiral of the Red. Sweden, under pressure from France, declared war on Britain in November 1810 but Saumarez showed conspicuous tact towards the government of Sweden and her shipping, correctly guessing that the Swedes, like their Russian neighbours, would eventually defy Napoleon. Charles XIII later bestowed on him the Grand Cross of the military Order of the Sword. Denmark, a French satellite, also needed to be kept under observation until it was invaded by the Swedish Army in 1814. In 1812 Napoleon invaded Russia with half a million troops and Saumarez's fleet was instrumental in hampering French operations.

Latter years and Plymouth Station

At the Peace of 1814, Saumarez attained the rank of Admiral of the Blue, On 18 July 1819 he was made Rear-Admiral of the United Kingdom. On 12 August 1819 he was advanced to the rank of Admiral of the White. On 21 November 1821 he was appointed Vice-Admiral of the United Kingdom. From 1824 to 1827 he was Commander-in-Chief, Plymouth. On 22 July 1830 he was promoted to the rank of Admiral of the Red. He was raised to the peerage as Baron de Saumarez in 1831 and died in Guernsey in 1836. In memory of Saumarez's achievements, there is a statue of him in the National Maritime Museum in London. The public bar at the Duke of Normandie Hotel in Saint Peter Port was named after Saumarez and features a portrait of him.

Relationship with Nelson

Saumarez and Nelson served together in 1797 and 1798, but their relationship was not a close one. In fact on a number of occasions it became quite strained. They first clashed after the Battle of Cape St Vincent. Saumarez had forced the surrender of the Santissima Trinidad but was unable to capture her because Jervis was forced to break off the engagement. Nelson attempted to console Saumarez by telling him that the Spanish had confirmed that the Trinidad had indeed surrendered. Saumarez tersely replied "Whoever doubted it, sir? I hope there is no need for such evidence to establish the truth of a report of a British officer."

In May 1798, when Saumarez was appointed to Nelson's squadron in the Mediterranean, Nelson preferred to confer with Troubridge and even though, as the senior captain, Saumarez was technically second in command, he was often left out of their conversations.

After the Battle of the Nile, while in conversation with Nelson, on the quarterdeck of HMS Vanguard, Saumarez suggested that the tactic of doubling the French line had been a dangerous one as it exposed British ships to 'friendly fire'. Before he had a chance to explain, Nelson cut him short and angrily went below. Nelson decided that Saumarez should escort the prizes home, and they never served together again.

Later Nelson wrote a letter saying, "I could have formed no opinion of Orion that was not favourable to her gallant and excellent commander (Saumarez) and crew". However, the awkwardness between them remained.

Family

In 1788, Saumarez married Martha le Marchant (d. 1849) of a wealthy Guernsey family, who brought the estate now known as Saumarez Park into the marriage. They had three sons and four daughters: The eldest, James (1789–1863), succeeded to the peerage, was a clergyman and died without children; he was succeeded in the peerage by his brother, John St. Vincent Saumarez (1806–1891).

Appearances in naval fiction
Saumarez appears as a minor character in C. S. Forester's Hornblower novel The Happy Return as a rear-admiral and is mentioned again in the later Hornblower novel The Commodore as the admiral soon to be commanding in the Baltic.

Saumarez appears as admiral of the Gibraltar Squadron in Master and Commander and also as admiral of the Baltic Fleet in The Surgeon's Mate, books from Patrick O'Brian's Aubrey–Maturin series.

In Treachery (2008) (US title The Privateer's Revenge) by Julian Stockwin, Saumerez's purported orders (actually a forgery) result in the disgrace of Thomas Kydd. Saumarez returns as commander of the Baltic Fleet in The Baltic Prize (2017).

References

Bibliography 
Sir John Ross, Memoirs of Admiral Lord de Saumarez (2 vols, 1838)
Shayer, David James Saumarez: The Life and Achievements of Admiral Lord de Saumarez of Guernsey (La Société Guernesiaise 2006)
The Naval Chronicle, Volume 6. J. Gould, 1801. (reissued by Cambridge University Press, 2010. )

Nelson and His Captains Dr W H Fitchett (Smith, Elder & Co. 1911 5th Edition pages 200–231)

External links
 
 

|-

1757 births
1836 deaths
Royal Navy admirals
Royal Navy personnel of the American Revolutionary War
Royal Navy personnel of the French Revolutionary Wars
British naval commanders of the Napoleonic Wars
Barons in the Peerage of the United Kingdom
Guernsey people
Knights Grand Cross of the Order of the Bath
Commanders Grand Cross of the Order of the Sword
James
Peers of the United Kingdom created by William IV